Malnati is a surname of Italian origin. Notable people with the surname include:

Peter Malnati (born 1987), American golfer
Will Malnati (born 1985), American restaurateur

See also
 Lou Malnati's Pizzeria

References

Surnames of Italian origin